The Assayer of Lone Gap is a 1915 short film directed by  B. Reeves Eason.

Cast
 Perry Banks
 Louise Lester
 Jack Richardson
 Vivian Rich
 Walter Spencer

References

External links

1915 films
1915 short films
American black-and-white films
American silent short films
Films directed by B. Reeves Eason
1910s American films